Plectobela zanclotoma is a moth of the family Oecophoridae. It is found in Australia.

The wingspan is 30–35 mm.

Oecophoridae